Gatesville is an unincorporated community in Hamblen Township, Brown County, in the U.S. state of Indiana.

History
The only post office in the history of Gatesville was called Cleona. It was established in 1855, and remained in operation until it was discontinued in 1903.

Geography

References

Unincorporated communities in Brown County, Indiana
Unincorporated communities in Indiana